Four Sheets to the Wind is a 2007 independent drama film written and directed by Sterlin Harjo.  It was Harjo's first feature film, and won several awards at the 2007 Sundance Film Festival and American Indian Film Festival.

Plot
The film tells the story of Cufe, a young Seminole/Creek man who travels from his small Oklahoma home town to Tulsa to visit his sister, Miri, after the suicide and funeral of their father.  While Miri struggles with her life in the city, Cufe becomes friendly, and then romantically involved, with Miri's neighbor, Francie, and he begins to perceive that his life has more possibilities than he had realized.

Production
The script was developed with the support of the Sundance Institute, and was filmed in Holdenville, Oklahoma (Harjo's hometown) and in Tulsa.  Harjo has commented that one of his purposes in writing the script was to react against expectations and stereotypes, for example by depicting Cufe "drinking a beer" while not making alcoholism a central issue, and showing him becoming involved with Francie without making the movie into "an issue-driven interracial relationship story".

Reception
The film premiered at the 2007 Sundance Film Festival, where it was nominated for the grand jury prize.  The film's co-star Tamara Podemski won a Sundance special jury prize for her performance as Miri, and she was later nominated for best supporting actress at the 2007 Independent Spirit Awards. At the 2007 American Indian Film Festival, Harjo was named best director, and Cody Lightning was named best actor for his performance as Cufe.

The film received largely positive reviews from critics. Hollywood Reporter/Associated Press reviewer Duane Byrge noted that it was a "captivating crowd-pleaser" at Sundance, praised the actors, and described it as "a personal story that transcends any specific heritage or geographic setting".  Variety'''s Dennis Harvey commented that the film is "so low-key it risks making little impression", but ultimately wins "viewer sympathy and affection".  Zack Haddad of Film Threat compared the film to Garden State'' and complimented its "wonderfuly oddball comedy" as well as its "heart-felt" message.

Cast
 Cody Lightning – Cufe Smallhill
 Tamara Podemski – Miri Smallhill
 Laura Bailey – Francie
 Jeri Arredondo – Cora Smallhill
 Jon Proudstar – Jim
 Mike Randleman – Sonny
 Richard Ray Whitman – Frankie Smallhill

Awards and nominations

References

External links
 
 
 
 32nd American Indian Film Festival

2007 drama films
2007 films
American independent films
Films about Native Americans
Films set in Oklahoma
Films shot in Oklahoma
American drama films
2007 independent films
2000s English-language films
2000s American films